Antimitra lirata is a species of sea snail, a marine gastropod mollusk in the family Colubrariidae.

References

Colubrariidae
Gastropods described in 1865